Jennifer Sigler is an American editor, formerly based in Rotterdam. From 2013–2019 she was Editor-in-Chief at the Harvard Graduate School of Design, where she revamped and oversaw Harvard Design Magazine, and started the series The Incidents, among other publications.

While in Rotterdam, Sigler was editor of Rem Koolhaas's seminal monograph S,M,L,XL (1995), and other works. She went on to create the Berlage Institute's journal, Hunch, in collaboration with architect Wiel Arets, and to edit its first seven issues.

Later, she collaborated with the Why Factory, a think tank at TU Delft run by Winy Maas; the Witte de With Center for Contemporary Art; Dutch Design Fashion Architecture (DutchDFA); Rotterdamse Schouwburg; and REX Architecture;  among others.  From 2008—2010 she was editorial director and event curator of the 4th International Architecture Biennale in Rotterdam (IABR), Open City, curated by Kees Christiaanse, and co-editor of the book Open City: Designing Coexistence (SUN Publishers, 2009). She is also the recipient of a grant by the Dutch Fund for Art and Architecture for her research into Domestic Labor and Design.

References 

Year of birth missing (living people)
American book editors
People from Rotterdam
Living people